Wayne Township is one of the twenty townships of Darke County, Ohio, United States. The 2010 census found 4,489 people in the township, 1,802 of whom lived in the unincorporated portions of the township.

Geography
Located in the northeastern part of the county, it borders the following townships:
Patterson Township - north
Cynthian Township, Shelby County - northeast corner
Loramie Township, Shelby County - east
Newberry Township, Miami County - southeast
Adams Township - south
Richland Township - southwest
York Township - northwest

The village of Versailles is located in central Wayne Township, and the unincorporated community of Frenchtown lies in the township's northwest.

Name and history
Wayne Township was established in 1817, and named for Anthony Wayne. It is one of twenty Wayne Townships statewide.

Government
The township is governed by a three-member board of trustees, who are elected in November of odd-numbered years to a four-year term beginning on the following January 1. Two are elected in the year after the presidential election and one is elected in the year before it. There is also an elected township fiscal officer, who serves a four-year term beginning on April 1 of the year after the election, which is held in November of the year before the presidential election. Vacancies in the fiscal officership or on the board of trustees are filled by the remaining trustees.  The current trustees are Michael Lawrence, Dennis Mestemaker, and Kenneth Moorman, and the clerk is Teresa Slonkosky.

The township's government is housed in Versailles, at the Versailles Town Hall and Wayne Township House, a structure on the National Register of Historic Places.

References

External links
County website

Townships in Darke County, Ohio
Townships in Ohio
1817 establishments in Ohio
Populated places established in 1817